Hipparchia syriaca is a species of butterfly in the family Nymphalidae. It is found in Greece especially on the island of Samos, Turkey, Bulgaria, Albania, North Macedonia, Caucasus and Transcaucasia.  It is found on the edges of foothills and mountain forests up to 2,000 m

Description
Very like Hipparchia hermione but the band of the forewing is narrower, being 
entirely obsolete in the anal area of the hindwing.

Flight period
Typically June to August, depending on altitude and locality. In Cyprus, the flight time of H. s. cypriaca is from May to October, or later.

Food plants
Larvae feed on Holcus species.

Biotope
Bushy places pine woods and clearings.

References

Sources
Species info
"Hipparchia Fabricius, 1807" at Markku Savela's Lepidoptera and Some Other Life Forms

syriaca
Butterflies of Europe
Butterflies of Asia